Derrick Lemel Stewart (born March 26, 1968), known professionally as Fatlip, is a Los Angeles-born hip hop musician. He started his career in the hip hop group The Pharcyde.

Early career

The Pharcyde
As a member of The Pharcyde, Fatlip contributed to the critically acclaimed Bizarre Ride II the Pharcyde as well as the follow-up release Labcabincalifornia. After the release of the Labcabincalifornia album, Fatlip was kicked out of the group, in part for leaving the supporting tour for their second album in favor of working on his own solo efforts.

In the group, Fatlip could be recognized for his conversational-style delivery of his verses and for having the deepest voice in the group.

Solo career
In 2005, Fatlip released his solo debut, The Loneliest Punk. It would stand as his only solo album until the release of “Torpor” 17 years later. The album includes his single from 2000, "What's Up Fatlip?" (which was included in the soundtrack for Tony Hawk's American Wasteland and the Youth In Revolt soundtrack.) The music video for "What's Up Fatlip?" was directed by Spike Jonze. During the filming process, Spike compiled a series of interviews with Fatlip and put them together in a documentary also titled "What's Up Fatlip?".  The album features guest appearances by Chali 2na (on the song "Today's Your Day", which is included in the skateboarding film Yeah Right!), as well as Shock G (on the song "Freaky Pumps".) The album contains songs produced by J-Swift, who was responsible for the production of The Pharcyde's first album Bizarre Ride II the Pharcyde.

Fatlip appeared on MTV's Jackass sliding down an escalator rail, and this was edited into his video for "Worst Case Scenario".

Collaborations

In 2001, Fatlip was featured on L.A. Symphony's Big Broke L.A. EP on the track "What You Say".

Fatlip had a cameo in Southern rapper Ludacris's “Get Back” video.

In 2007, he collaborated with The Chemical Brothers on their song "The Salmon Dance" which is featured on their album We Are the Night.

Fatlip is featured on the track "Dream and Imaginate" by The Wascals.

Fatlip has collaborated with a crew from France known as the Jazz Liberatorz. In 2008, he appeared on their album Clin D'Oeil. He was featured on two tracks, “Ease My Mind“ and “Genius At Work”, the latter of which also featured Tre Hardson, Omni, and T-Love. He also appeared twice on the subsequent Jazz Liberatorz album, Fruit of the Past. The two songs on that album on which he appeared were called “My Style Is Fly” and “Back Packers”.

Fatlip is featured on the song "Luxury Pool" from the 2008 album Stainless Style by Neon Neon.

In early 2009, Fatlip also appeared on two tracks on The Spirit of Apollo, the debut album by N.A.S.A., which was a collaboration project between Sam Spiegel and DJ Zegon. The two songs were "Hip Hop" (also featuring KRS-One and Tre Hardson) and "Strange Enough" (also featuring Karen O and Ol' Dirty Bastard.) Other artists who appeared on the album included Method Man, E-40, Chali 2na, and David Byrne, among others.

2016 saw Fatlip collaborate with Edo G on a song called "Playtimee Over", produced by Tone Spliff. Then, in 2017, Fatlip was featured on the track "Mr. Lonely" by Portland-based band Portugal. The Man. The song was included on the band's album Woodstock, and Fatlip received a writing credit for it.

In 2019, Fatlip appeared on “Aw Hell You Motherfuckin’ Right”, a song from A Joy Which Nothing Can Erase, the third full-length album by Toronto rapper The Mighty Rhino. The song also featured Ultra Magnus, and was produced by Myer Clarity, with scratches by DJ Digital Junkie.

In 2020, Fatlip released a collaboration with Blu and Samuel T. Herring, the latter credited as Hemlock Ernst. The song was called "Good For The Soul". That year also saw Fatlip collaborate with Percee P and Phil Da Agony on the song "For You".

Reunion with Tre Hardson
Fatlip has reunited with former Pharcyde member Tre Hardson to perform on The Over 30, Dirty Old Men Tour together.

Fatlip was featured in the song "All I Want for Christmas (Is Somebody Else)" with Tre Hardson featuring St. Imey (formerly of The Wascals) and produced by J-Swift.

Torpor: Pharcyde reunion
On February 18, 2022, Fatlip released the lead single, "Dust in the Wind", from his solo album, Torpor, produced by Los Angeles-based production team Sccit & Siavash The Grouch. The single featured Krayzie Bone of Bone Thugs-N-Harmony. The album marked the first reunion of the four original Pharcyde members in 25 years, on a single titled "My Bad".

Discography

References

External links
 What's Up, Fatlip? on Delicious Vinyl's YouTube channel

1968 births
Living people
Rappers from Los Angeles
Place of birth missing (living people)
Delicious Vinyl artists
African-American male rappers
West Coast hip hop musicians
21st-century American rappers
21st-century American male musicians
The Pharcyde members